The A. E. Perkins House is a historic house in Jacksboro, Tennessee, U.S.. The house was built circa 1850 for James Williams and his wife, Rebecca. It remained in the Williams family until 1930, when it was purchased by Alexander Early Perkins.

The house was first built as in the I-house style circa 1850. It was redesigned in the Colonial Revival architectural style in 1930. It has been listed on the National Register of Historic Places since December 8, 1997.

References

Houses on the National Register of Historic Places in Tennessee
Colonial Revival architecture in Tennessee
Houses completed in 1850
Buildings and structures in Campbell County, Tennessee